[Johann] Ignaz Albrecht (born 1759) was an Austrian engraver active from ca. 1789. He is listed as an engraver in the various Viennese Kommerzialschematismen until 1814. The "Verlassenschaftsabhandlungen" and the "Totenbeschauprotokolle" in the Wiener Stadt- und Landesarchiv reveal that two of Albrecht's children died in 1791 and a third died in 1796. During this period the residence of this "Kupferstecher" is given as "auf der Wieden No. 312."

Albrecht engraved almanacs, maps, coats-of-arms, and numerous theater scenes for the multi-volume Theatralische Sammlung (Wien: Joh. Jos. Jahn) from c. 1789-1793. Some 184 of his engravings were published in two volumes as Das Deutsche Theater in Bildern in 1802. He also engraved the Allmanach für Theaterfreunde auf das Jahr 1791, the Atlas von Italien mit einem dazugehörigen nach A. F. Buschings grossen Erdbeschreibung geographischen Anhange in 1796, the Versuch über das Kostüm der vorzüglichsten Volker des Alterthums, des Mittelalter und der neuern Zeiten (3/1798), and Ferdinand Bernhard Vietz's Icones plantarum medico-oeconomico-technologicarum, 1800--.

Albrecht is often confused in the standard biographical literature with the Austrian illustrator, engraver, printer and publisher Ignaz Alberti (1760-1794).

References

 David J. Buch, "Newly-identified Engravings of Scenes from Emanuel Schikaneder's Theater auf der Wieden 1789-1790 in the Allmanach für Theaterfreunde (1791)," in Theater am Hof und für das Volk. Beiträge zur vergleichenden Theater- und Kulturgeschichte. Festschrift für Otto G. Schindler zum 60.Geburtstag, ed. Brigitte Marschall. Vienna: Böhlau, 2002, 343-69.
Johannes Dörflinger, Die österreichische Kartographie im 18. Und zu Beginn des 19. Jahrhunderts: Bd. Österreichische Karten des 18. Jahrhunderts, 1984, p. 107

External links
"Icones Plantarum Medico-Oeconomico-Technologicarum" download
"Icones Plantarum" description - Christa Kletter (University of Vienna, 2011)

Austrian engravers
1759 births
Year of death missing